
Gmina Wiązowna is a rural gmina (administrative district) in Otwock County, Masovian Voivodeship, in east-central Poland.

The gmina contains part of the protected area called Masovian Landscape Park.

Villages
Gmina Wiązowna contains the villages and settlements of Bolesławów, Boryszew, Czarnówka, Duchnów, Dziechciniec, Emów, Glinianka, Góraszka, Izabela, Kopki, Kruszówiec, Lipowo, Majdan, Malcanów, Michałówek, Pęclin, Poręby, Radiówek, Rzakta, Stefanówka, Wiązowna, Wiązowna Kościelna, Wola Ducka, Wola Karczewska, Zagórze, Zakręt and Żanęcin.

Neighbouring gminas
Gmina Wiązowna is bordered by Warsaw, by the towns of Józefów, Otwock and Sulejówek, and by the gminas of Celestynów, Dębe Wielkie, Halinów, Karczew, Kołbiel and Mińsk Mazowiecki.

References
Polish official population figures 2006

Wiazowna
Otwock County